Tero Tapani Saviniemi (born July 8, 1963 in Tampere) is a retired male javelin thrower from Finland. He competed for his native country at the 1984 Summer Olympics in Los Angeles, California, finishing in 17th place. He set his personal best (86.78 metres) with the old javelin in 1984. Sabiniemi won the national title in 1984.

Achievements

References
sports-reference

1963 births
Living people
Sportspeople from Tampere
Finnish male javelin throwers
Athletes (track and field) at the 1984 Summer Olympics
Olympic athletes of Finland